The 1964/1965 League of Ireland was contested by 12 teams, and Drumcondra won the championship.

Final classification

Results

Top scorers

League of Ireland seasons
Ireland
1964–65 in Republic of Ireland association football